Razdrto is a village below and on the southern slopes of the Nanos Plateau in the Municipality of Postojna in the Inner Carniola region of Slovenia. It lies at a major interchange on the A1 motorway connecting Ljubljana to the Slovenian Littoral.

Church

The local church in the settlement is dedicated to the Holy Trinity and belongs to the Parish of Ubeljsko.

References

External links
Razdrto on Geopedia

Populated places in the Municipality of Postojna